Maximiliano Cavanna (born 2 July 1988) is an Argentine professional volleyball player. He was a member of the Argentina national team. At the professional club level, he plays for Ural Ufa.

Honours

Clubs
 CSV South American Club Championship
  Belo Horizonte 2019 – with UPCN Vóley Club

 National championships
 2007/2008  Argentine Cup, with Bolívar Vóley
 2007/2008  Argentine Championship, with Bolívar Vóley
 2008/2009  Argentine Cup, with Bolívar Vóley
 2008/2009  Argentine Championship, with Bolívar Vóley
 2011/2012  Argentine Cup, with La Unión de Formosa
 2016/2017  Argentine Cup, with Lomas Vóley
 2017/2018  Argentine Championship, with UPCN Vóley Club

Individual awards
 2017: Argentine Championship – Best Setter
 2018: Argentine Championship – Best Setter
 2019: CSV South American Club Championship – Best Setter

References

External links

 
 Player profile at LegaVolley.it 
 Player profile at PlusLiga.pl  
 Player profile at Volleybox.net 

1988 births
Living people
Volleyball players from Buenos Aires
Argentine men's volleyball players
Argentine Champions of men's volleyball
Pan American Games medalists in volleyball
Volleyball players at the 2011 Pan American Games
Medalists at the 2011 Pan American Games
Pan American Games bronze medalists for Argentina
Argentine expatriate sportspeople in Italy
Expatriate volleyball players in Italy
Argentine expatriate sportspeople in Poland
Expatriate volleyball players in Poland
Argentine expatriate sportspeople in Russia
Expatriate volleyball players in Russia
Warta Zawiercie players
Setters (volleyball)